Potter County is a county located in the U.S. state of Texas. As of the 2020 census, its population was 118,525. Its county seat is Amarillo. The county was created in 1876 and organized in 1887. It is named for Robert Potter, a politician, signer of the Texas Declaration of Independence, and the Texas Secretary of the Navy.

Potter County is included in the Amarillo metropolitan area.

History

LX Ranch
The LX Ranch was established in the county by W.H. "Deacon" Bates and David T. Beals by 1877. In July 1876, Bates, along with some cowboys that included Charlie Siringo, established a herd of steers and ranch headquarters along Ranch Creek on the north bank of the Canadian River. The headquarters eventually included a bunkhouse, kitchen, storeroom, stables, corrals, blacksmith shop, wagon sheds, and a post office named Wheeler. The LX also established the county's first cemetery. The ranch eventually extended from Dumas to the Palo Duro Canyon and 35 miles east to west. By 1884, the ranch encompassed 187,000 acres, 45,000 cattle, and 1000 horses, when the operation was sold to the American Pastoral Company. In 1902, the ranch headquarters were moved to Bonita Creek, on the south bank of the Canadian River. On 6 October 1910, that company sold 30,354 acres south of the river to Lee Bivins, and on 1 June 1911, R.B. "Ben" Masterson acquired 89,139 acres on the north side. On 19 May 1915, Bivins bought an additional 53,329 LX acres, which included the LX brand.

Geography

Major highways

Adjacent counties
 Moore County (north)
 Hutchinson County (northeast)
 Carson County (east)
 Armstrong County (southeast)
 Randall County (south)
 Deaf Smith County (southwest)
 Oldham County (west)
 Hartley County (northwest)

National protected areas
 Alibates Flint Quarries National Monument
 Lake Meredith National Recreation Area (part)

Demographics

Note: the US Census treats Hispanic/Latino as an ethnic category. This table excludes Latinos from the racial categories and assigns them to a separate category. Hispanics/Latinos can be of any race.

As of the census of 2000,  113,546 people, 40,760 households, and 27,472 families were residing in the county. The population density was 125 people per square mile (48/km2). The 44,598 housing units had an average density of 49 per square mile (19/km2). The racial makeup of the county was 68.60% White, 9.96% African American, 0.87% Native American, 2.49% Asian,  15.48% from other races, and 2.60% from two or more races. About 28.11% of the population were Hispanics or Latinos of any race.

Of the 40,760 households, 34.7% had children under 18 living with them, 47.4% were married couples living together, 15.0% had a female householder with no husband present, and 32.6% were not families. About 27.6% of all households were made up of individuals, and 10.1% had someone living alone who was 65 or older. The average household size was 2.61, and the average family size was 3.21.

In the county, the age distribution was 28.0% under 18, 11.1% from 18 to 24, 30.1% from 25 to 44, 19.1% from 45 to 64, and 11.7% who were 65 or older. The median age was 32 years. For every 100 females, there were 100.90 males. For every 100 females 18 and over, there were 100.20 males.

The median income for a household in the county was $29,492, and for a family was $35,321. Males had a median income of $26,123 versus $20,275 for females. The per capita income for the county was $14,947. About 15.2% of families and 19.2% of the population were below the poverty line, including 25.3% of those under 18 and 12.3% of those 65 or over.

Government and infrastructure
The Texas Department of Criminal Justice Clements Unit and Neal Unit are located in unincorporated Potter County, east of the City of Amarillo.

Politics
Potter County has supported Republican presidential candidates in every election since 1968, usually by lopsided margins. However, as the county's population has increased, the percentage of Democratic voters has also. According to the 2020 Election, it is the most liberal county in the Texas Panhandle. In 2004, George W. Bush received 21,401 votes (74% of the total) in the county to just 7,489 votes (25%) for his opponent, John Kerry. In 2020, Donald J. Trump received 22,820 votes (69%) in the county as opposed to Joseph R. Biden, who received 9,921 votes (30% of the total).

Communities

Cities
 Amarillo (county seat) (partly in Randall County)

Towns
 Bishop Hills

Unincorporated communities
 Ady
 Bushland
 Cliffside
 Gentry
 St. Francis

Historical communities
 Folsom
 Pleasant Valley
 Pullman
 Soncy

Education
School districts include:
 Amarillo Independent School District
 Bushland Independent School District
 Highland Park Independent School District
 River Road Independent School District

All of the county is in the service area of Amarillo College.

See also

 List of museums in the Texas Panhandle
 National Register of Historic Places listings in Potter County, Texas
 Recorded Texas Historic Landmarks in Potter County

References

External links
 Potter County government's website
 
 Historic Potter County materials, hosted by the Portal to Texas History.
 Potter County, TX Genealogy
 Potter County Profile from the Texas Association of Counties
 

 
1887 establishments in Texas
Populated places established in 1887
Texas Panhandle
Majority-minority counties in Texas